The 2024 CONCACAF W Gold Cup will be the inaugural season of the CONCACAF W Gold Cup, an international women's football competition contested by the senior women's national teams of the member associations of CONCACAF. The tournament will be contested by 12 teams from 20 February to 10 March 2024 in the United States. Eight CONCACAF national teams will qualify for the tournament, joined by four guest teams from CONMEBOL.

Format
On 10 December 2020, the CONCACAF Council approved the structure and calendar of the competition. The qualification competition, known as the "Road to Concacaf W Gold Cup", will begin with the group stage, featuring 33 women's national teams of CONCACAF split into three leagues (A, B and C). Each league will feature three groups, containing three teams each in League A, and four teams each in Leagues B and C. The teams in each group will play against each other home-and-away in a round-robin format. The top three teams in League A will qualify directly for the W Gold Cup. The group runners-up of League A and the League B group winners will participate in a play-in in April 2024 to compete for the final three spots at the W Gold Cup. The two CONCACAF women's national teams that qualify for the Summer Olympics in 2024 will receive a bye directly to the W Gold Cup, skipping qualification.

The final tournament will be held from 20 February to 10 March 2024. Originally, CONCACAF announced the tournament would be played in June 2024, the month prior to the start of the 2024 Olympic women's football tournament, but on 8 March 2023 announced it would be moved earlier to February and March. The W Gold Cup will feature twelve teams, including the two teams that qualified for the Summer Olympics, the six teams that qualified from the group stage and play-in, and four guest national teams. The twelve teams will be split into three groups of four, and will compete in a single round-robin. Eight teams, the top two teams of each group and the two-best third-placed teams, will advance to the knockout stage. The knockout stage will consist of quarter-finals, semi-finals and a final to determine the champion.

On 27 January 2023, the United States were confirmed as hosts of the tournament. In addition, the top four teams from CONMEBOL's 2022 Copa América Femenina were confirmed as guests for the tournament.

Qualification

The league stage of qualification will take place in September, October and November 2023, while the play-in will take place in April 2024.

Qualified teams

Notes

Group stage

Group A

Group B

Group C

Ranking of third-placed teams

Knockout stage

Bracket

Quarter-finals

Semi-finals

Final

References

External links

2024
Women's Nations League
2024 in American women's soccer
2024
2024 in women's association football
February 2024 sports events in the United States
March 2024 sports events in North America
Scheduled association football competitions